The Bolivian National Congress 1985–1989 was elected on 14 July 1985.

Chamber of Deputies

Chamber of Senators 

 

AND – Nationalist Democratic Action

FPU – United People's Front

FSB – Bolivian Socialist Falange

MIR – Revolutionary Left Movement

MIR-BL – Movement of the Revolutionary Left-Free Bolivia

MNR – Revolutionary Nationalist Movement

MNRI – Nationalist Revolutionary Movement of the Left

MNRI-Siglo XX – Leftwing Revolutionary Nationalist Movement - 20th Century

MNRV – Revolutionary Nationalist Movement-Vanguard

MRTKL – Revolutionary Liberation Movement Tupaq Katari

PCB – Communist Party of Bolivia

PCML – Communist Party of Bolivia (Marxist–Leninist)

PDC – Christian Democratic Party

PS-1 – Socialist Party-One

UDC – Christian Democratic Union

Presidents of the National Congress

Presidents of the Chamber of Senators

Presidents of the Chamber of Deputies

Notes

Political history of Bolivia